Wayning Moments is the third album by saxophonist Wayne Shorter (and his final album for Vee-Jay Records), showcasing Wayne playing hard bop with trumpeter Freddie Hubbard, pianist Eddie Higgins, bassist Jymie Merritt and drummer Marshall Thompson. CD reissues added alternate takes of all eight tracks.

Track listing
All compositions by Wayne Shorter except where noted.

 "Black Orpheus" [Take 4] (Luiz Bonfá, Antônio Maria) – 4:35
 "Devil's Island" [Take 8] – 3:56
 "Moon of Manakoora" [Take 2] (Frank Loesser, Alfred Newman) – 3:45
 "Dead End" [Take 8] – 4:35
 "Wayning Moments" [Take 2] (Eddie Higgins) – 4:22
 "Powder Keg" [Take 5] – 3:14
 "All or Nothing at All" [Take 3] (Arthur Altman, Jack Lawrence) – 2:58
 "Callaway Went That-A-Way" [Take 3] – 4:54

Bonus tracks on CD
 "Black Orpheus" [Take 3] – 4:43
 "Devil's Island" [Take 7] – 4:00
 "Moon of Manakoora" [Take 1] – 4:50
 "Dead End" [Take 7] – 4:40
 "Wayning Moments" [Take 3] – 6:19
 "Powder Keg" [Take 1] – 3:38
 "All or Nothing at All" [Take 2] – 2:59
 "Callaway Went That-A-Way" [Take 1] – 3:59

Note
Recorded on November 2nd (1, 4, 7-9, 12, 15-16) and 6th (2-3, 5-6, 10-11, 13-14), 1961.

Personnel
Wayne Shorter – tenor saxophone
Freddie Hubbard – trumpet
Eddie Higgins – piano
Jymie Merritt – double-bass
Marshall Thompson – drums

References

External links 
 Wayne Shorter - Wayning Moments (1962) album releases & credits at Discogs
 Wayne Shorter - Wayning Moments (1962) album to be listened on YouTube

1962 albums
Wayne Shorter albums
Vee-Jay Records albums
Post-bop albums
Hard bop albums